Ethen is a given name and a variation of the name Ethan. Notable people with the name include:

Ethen Beavers, American comic book artist
Ethen Roberts (born 1990), American professional Freeride Mountain Bike and FMX rider
Ethen Sampson (born 1993), South African soccer player

See also
Ethan (disambiguation)
Etan (disambiguation)
Eitan (disambiguation)